Slaven Rimac (born 19 December 1974) is a Croatian professional basketball coach and former player who is an assistant coach for Bayern Munich. 

His mother Ružica Meglaj-Rimac, brother Davor and aunt Kornelija Meglaj were all professional basketball players.

Playing career
Rimac led the 1996–97 EuroLeague in free throws shooting percentage 93.1%. He retired from professional basketball in May 2012, as a member of the French club EB Pau-Orthez.

National team career
Rimac was a member of the senior Croatian national basketball team at the 1996 Summer Olympics and 1997 EuroBasket.

Coaching career

Cibona (2013–2015)
On 14 November 2013, following the departure of Neven Spahija, Rimac was appointed the head coach of Cibona. He led the club to win the 2013–14 ABA League championship, despite the huge financial problems that the club was facing at the time. As the champion of the ABA League, Cibona gained a direct spot in the following EuroLeague season, but the club withdrew from it in order to stabilize financially. Eventually, Crvena zvezda, the third-placed team in the league, took Cibona's spot in the EuroLeague. He was sacked in Cibona on 6 December 2015, following a series of poor results in the ABA League.

Cedevita (2017–2019)
From 2017 to 2018, Rimac worked as an assistant coach of Cedevita under the coaching staff of Jure Zdovc, while between June and October 2018, he served as the head coach of the Cedevita second team, which played in the Croatian League regular season.

On 25 October 2018, following the departure of Sito Alonso, who led the first team in the ABA League and EuroCup, Rimac was appointed his successor as Cedevita head coach. In July 2019, Cedevita merged with the Slovenian club Petrol Olimpija to form a new club named Cedevita Olimpija.

Cedevita Olimpija (2019–2020)
On 8 July 2019, Rimac was named the first head coach for Cedevita Olimpija in the club's history. On 27 January 2020, he was replaced by Jurica Golemac.

Career achievements and awards
Club titles than Rimac won as a senior level player:
Croatian League Champion: (with Cibona: 1991–92, 1992–93, 1993–94, 1994–95, 1995–96, 1996–97, 1997–98, 2003–04)
Turkish League Champion: (with Tofaş: 1998–99, 1999–2000)
Turkish Cup Winner: (with Tofaş: 1998–99, 1999–2000)

Club titles that Rimac won as a head coach:
ABA League Champion: (with Cibona: 2013–14)
Croatian Cup Winner: (with Cedevita: 2018–19)

References

External links
 KK Cedevita official page

1974 births
Living people
Croatian people of Slovenian descent
ABA League-winning coaches
ABA League players
AEK B.C. players
Basketball players at the 1996 Summer Olympics
BC Azovmash players
Croatian basketball coaches
Croatian expatriate basketball people in France
Croatian expatriate basketball people in Spain
Croatian expatriate basketball people in Turkey
Croatian men's basketball players
Élan Béarnais players
Croatian expatriate basketball people in Greece
Croatian expatriate basketball people in Italy
Joventut Badalona players
KK Cedevita coaches
KK Cedevita Olimpija coaches
KK Cedevita players
KK Cibona coaches
KK Cibona players
Liga ACB players
Makedonikos B.C. players
Olimpia Milano players
Olympic basketball players of Croatia
Paris Racing Basket players
Tofaş S.K. players
Shooting guards
STB Le Havre players
Croatian expatriate basketball people in Slovenia
KK Dubrava players
Croatian expatriate basketball people in Ukraine
Croatian expatriate basketball people in Germany